The Real Lee Konitz is a live album by American jazz saxophonist Lee Konitz which was released on the Atlantic record label in 1957.

Critical reception

Jim Todd of Allmusic states "The result of this low-tech production is a fine document of Konitz playing live in a fairly straight-ahead setting. The sound is good and places the leader's alto sax at the forefront, as he floats his sinewy, pleasantly acerbic sound over the attentive work of the rhythm section".

Track listing 
 "Straightaway" (Lee Konitz) - 3:41
 "Foolin' Myself" (Andy Razaf, Fats Waller) - 4:40
 "You Go to My Head" (J. Fred Coots, Haven Gillespie) - 6:10
 "My Melancholy Baby" (Ernie Burnett, George A. Norton) - 3:56
 "Pennies in Minor" (Lennie Tristano) - 8:42
 "Sweet and Lovely" (Gus Arnheim, Jules LeMare, Harry Tobias) - 2:15
 "Easy Livin'" (Ralph Rainger, Leo Robin) - 3:35
 "Midway" (Konitz) - 3:20

Personnel 
Lee Konitz - alto saxophone
Don Ferrara - trumpet (tracks 5 & 6)
Billy Bauer - guitar 
Peter Ind - bass
Dick Scott - drums

References 

Lee Konitz live albums
1957 live albums
Atlantic Records live albums